Chie Kanda (born ) is a retired Japanese female volleyball player.

She was part of the Japan women's national volleyball team at the 1998 FIVB Volleyball Women's World Championship in Japan.

References

1971 births
Living people
Japanese women's volleyball players
Place of birth missing (living people)
Asian Games medalists in volleyball
Volleyball players at the 1998 Asian Games
Medalists at the 1998 Asian Games
Asian Games bronze medalists for Japan